Preston Brook railway station was a station on the Grand Junction Railway serving the villages of Preston Brook and Preston on the Hill in what was then Cheshire, England. It opened on 4 July 1837 when the line opened.

The station is located in a cutting on the south side of the Warrington to Chester turnpike (which is now Chester Road, the A56). The road crossed the railway on an over-bridge, with a ramp down to the station building on the down, western, side of the tracks. Initially there were no platforms and a single storey hipped roof building.

By 1898 the station had platforms and the main building on the down platform had been enlarged, this platform was still accessed via a ramp. On the up platform there were some buildings, probably a shelter, and steps down from the road.

In the early days there were two mixed trains in each direction, times changed from year to year. 

The station closed to passengers and parcels on 1 March 1948 but it continued in use for railway workers until 1963. 

The goods yard was equipped for general goods and livestock with a 1½ ton crane. The goods yard closed on 1 September 1958.

The line is still open, other than a station house, no substantive remains exist as of 2016.



References

Notes

Citations

Bibliography

Disused railway stations in Cheshire
Former London and North Western Railway stations
Railway stations in Great Britain opened in 1837
Railway stations in Great Britain closed in 1948